Estelle Grelier (born 22 June 1973 in La Roche-sur-Yon, Vendée) is a French politician of the Socialist Party (PS) who served as Secretary of State for Local Authorities in the governments of successive Prime Ministers Manuel Valls and Bernard Cazeneuve from 2016 until 2017.

Political career 
Grelier was a Member of the European Parliament from 2009 until 2012 for the North-West constituency. In parliament, she served on the Committee on Budgets.

Following the 2012 French legislative election, Grelier became a member of the National Assembly, where she served on the Committee on European Affairs until 2016.

References

1973 births
Living people
MEPs for North-West France 2009–2014
21st-century women MEPs for France
Socialist Party (France) MEPs
Deputies of the 14th National Assembly of the French Fifth Republic
Women government ministers of France
People from La Roche-sur-Yon
Politicians from Normandy